Persatuan Sepak Bola Bintang Jaya Asahan, commonly known as PS Bintang Jaya Asahan, was an  Indonesian football club based in Asahan Regency, North Sumatra. The club was merged with YSK 757 Karimun in 2017 to form 757 Kepri Jaya F.C.

In 2013, the club played in Liga Indonesia Premier Division.

References

External links
Bintang Jaya at BLAI.co
Bintang Jaya on Facebook

Defunct football clubs in Indonesia
Football clubs in Indonesia
Association football clubs established in 2008
2008 establishments in Indonesia